Argyresthia chrysidella is a moth of the  family Yponomeutidae. It is found in France.

The wingspan is 14–15 mm.

The larvae feed on cade juniper (Juniperus oxycedrus) and Phoenicean juniper (Juniperus phoenicea). They feed on the fruit of their host plant. They leave the fruit in autumn to pupate in the soil.

References

Argyresthia
Moths described in 1877
Moths of Europe
Taxa named by Henri de Peyerimhoff